Urga may refer to:

 former name of Ulaanbaatar, the capital of Mongolia
 the former Catholic missio sui iuris of Urga
 Ürgə, a village and municipality in Lankaran Rayon of Azerbaijan
 Urga (movie) aka Close to Eden, a 1991 film by Nikita Mikhalkov
 Urga (Cazin), Bosnia and Herzegovina
 Urga (music group), an alternative music group from Sweden.